Alp Grüm railway station is a railway station in the municipality of Poschiavo, in the Swiss canton of Graubünden. It is located on the south side of Bernina Pass, on the Bernina line of the Rhaetian Railway. It serves the hamlet of Alp Grüm, which, except in summer, is accessible only from the railway. From the station, thanks mainly to the 180° curve immediately to the south, there are far-reaching views of the Palü Glacier, Lago Palu and the Puschlav.

The station has three through tracks and a siding. Two of the through tracks are served by its two platforms and station building.

From Alp Grüm the Bernina Railway snakes down around tight curves and spiral tunnels with a gradient of up to 7% into Puschlav, in the Italian-speaking part of Switzerland.

The section of line between Ospizio Bernina and Poschiavo, on which the station is located, was opened on 5 June 1910 by the Bernina Railway Company. During construction of the line, Alp Grüm was created as a crossing loop. The current station building, together with its buffet and hotel, was opened in 1923.

Services
The following services stop at Alp Grüm:

 Regio: hourly service between St. Moritz and Tirano.

References

External links

 
 
 Webcam overlooking Alp Grüm station 

Railway stations in Switzerland opened in 1910
Railway stations in Graubünden
Rhaetian Railway stations
Poschiavo